Romance (Romance X) is a 1999 French arthouse film written and directed by Catherine Breillat. It stars Caroline Ducey, Rocco Siffredi, Sagamore Stévenin and François Berléand. The film features explicit copulation scenes, especially one showing Ducey's coitus with Siffredi. Romance is one of several arthouse films featuring explicit, unsimulated sex, along with The Brown Bunny (2003), 9 Songs (2004) and All About Anna (2005).

Plot

A young woman named Marie (Ducey) lives with her boyfriend, Paul (Stévenin), who refuses to have sex with her. She searches for intimacy beyond the bounds of traditional sexual limitations. She has a sexual relationship with Paolo (Siffredi), whom she meets in a bar. Her frustration also drives her to a series of relationships, until she engages in sadomasochism with an older man.

Cast
 Caroline Ducey as Marie
 Sagamore Stévenin as Paul
 François Berléand as Robert
 Rocco Siffredi as Paolo
 Ashley Wanninger as Ashley
 Emma Colberti as Charlotte
 Fabien de Jomaron as Claude

Production
In an interview with The Post, Catherine Breillat appeared to confirm the rumors of actual on-set sex. "An actor never pretends," she said. "At the same time, I'm not perverse. I don't impose on my actors or actresses any more than is absolutely necessary. But I don't pretend. I don't simulate. The deal was, we'd go as far as we had to, as far as the film required." Caroline Ducey accepted the part of Marie knowing that 'going all the way' was written into her contract. Apparently, Ducey began the film thinking that it would also be an exit from the sexual relationship she was in, but then decided while it was being made that she wanted to stay with her boyfriend. By the end, she was in a state of considerable distress. Rocco Siffredi says, "There was a bit of a clash and I had to leave the set to calm down. Caroline seemed to be frightened of me and was crying. When I came back I could not get an erection - it was awful. But when I was only looking at her I felt very lustful for her, i thought about her boyfriend then immediately I got my erection back and she put a condom on me and I took her."

Broadcasting and ratings
In Europe, Romance was shown in mainstream cinemas; in the United States, it was reduced to a mainstream-acceptable R rating, and the European original version is un-rated. In the UK, the BBFC passed the film uncut for cinemas, though home releases suffered a brief cut to an ejaculation shot. In March 2004, the original version was broadcast, late-night on German public television. In Australia, the original version of Romance was broadcast uncut on the cable television network World Movies. The film was initially refused classification in Australia, before it was awarded an R18+ on appeal. It single-handedly paved the way for actual sex to be accommodated in the R18+ classification in Australia.

In Canada, particularly in Alberta and the Maritimes, the sexuality was seen as gratuitous to the film and it was given an A rating and XXX rating in those regions. In June 2008, in the Netherlands, the original version of Romance was broadcast on Dutch public TV by VPRO as one of a series of Erotica art house cinema.

See also
 Sadism and masochism in fiction
 Unsimulated sex

References

Sources 

 Angelo, Adrienne. (2010) ‘Sexual Cartographies: Mapping Subjectivity in the Cinema of Catherine Breillat’, Journal for Cultural Research, 14(1), pp. 43–55. https://doi.org/10.1080/14797580903363082.
 Coulthard, Lisa. (2010) ‘Desublimating Desire: Courtly Love and Catherine Breillat’, Journal for Cultural Research, 14(1), pp. 57–69. https://doi.org/10.1080/14797580903363090.
 Coulthard, Lisa and Birks, Chelsea. (2016) ‘Horrible Sex: The Sexual Relationship In New Extremism’, in L. Coleman (ed.) Sex and Storytelling in Modern Cinema: Explicit Sex, Performance and Cinematic Technique. I.B.Tauris & Co., pp. 71–94. https://doi.org/10.5040/9780755694655.
 Gorton, Kristyn. (2007) ‘“The Point of View of Shame”: Re-viewing female desire in Catherine Breillat’s Romance (1999) and Anatomy of Hell (2004)’, Studies in European Cinema, 4(2), pp. 111–124. https://doi.org/10.1386/seci.4.2.111_1.
 Hottell, Ruth A. and Russell-Watts, Lynsey. (2002) ‘Catherine Breillat’s Romance and the Female Spectator: From Dream-Work to Therapy’, L’Esprit Créateur, 42(3), pp. 70–80. https://doi.org/10.1353/esp.2010.0395.
 Krisjansen, Ivan. and Maddock, Trevor. (2001) ‘Educating Eros: Catherine Breillat’s Romance as a Cinematic Solution to Sade’s Metaphysical Problem’, Studies in French Cinema, 1(3), pp. 141–149. DOI: 10.1386/sfci.1.3.141
 Mtshali, Marya .T. and Fahs, Breanne. (2014) ‘Catherine Breillat’s Romance and Anatomy of Hell : Subjectivity and the Gendering of Sexuality’, Women: A Cultural Review, 25(2), pp. 160–175. https://doi.org/10.1080/09574042.2014.944415.
 Phillips, John. (2001) ‘Catherine Breillat’s Romance: Hard Core and the Female Gaze’, Studies in French Cinema, 1(3), pp. 133–140. https://doi.org/10.1386/sfci.1.3.133.
 Wheatley, Catherine. (2010) ‘Contested Interactions: Watching Catherine Breillat’s Scenes of Sexual Violence’, Journal for Cultural Research, 14(1), pp. 27–41. https://doi.org/10.1080/14797580903363066
 Wilson, Emma. (2001) ‘Deforming Femininity: Catherine Breillat’s Romance’, in Lucy Mazdon (ed.) France on Film: Reflections on Popular French Cinema. London: Wallflower, pp. 145–157.

External links
 
 
 
 
 

1999 films
1999 drama films
1990s erotic drama films
1990s French-language films
Adultery in films
BDSM in films
Films about rape
Films directed by Catherine Breillat
Films set in France
Films shot in France
French erotic drama films
Obscenity controversies in film
1990s French films